Kanam may refer to:


Places
 Kanam, Tamil Nadu, a panchayat town in Thoothukudi, Tamil Nadu, India
 Kanam (Kerala), a village in Kottayam, Kerala, India
 Kanam, Nigeria, a Local Government Area in Plateau State
 Kanam prehistoric site, a site in Kenya

People
 Barbara Kanam (born 1973), Congolese singer
 Kanam E. J. (1926–1987), Malayalam fiction writer and lyricist
 Kanam Rajendran (born 1950), Indian politician

Films
 Kanam, Telugu-language version of the 2018 Indian film Diya (film)
 Kanam, Tamil-language version of the 2022 Indian film Oke Oka Jeevitham

Other uses
 கனம் (kanam), a Tamil honorific meaning weight

See also
 Kaname, a Japanese name